The 2006 World Junior Curling Championships were held from March 11 to 19 in Jeonju, South Korea.

Men

Teams

Round-robin standings
Final Round Robin Standings

Round-robin results

Draw 1
Saturday, March 11, 14:00

Draw 2
Sunday, March 12, 9:00

Draw 3
Sunday, March 12, 19:00

Draw 4
Monday, March 13, 14:00

Draw 5
Tuesday, March 14, 9:00

Draw 6
Tuesday, March 14, 19:00

Draw 7
Wednesday, March 15, 14:00

Draw 8
Thursday, March 16, 9:00

Draw 9
Thursday, March 16, 19:00

Playoffs

Semifinals
Saturday, March 18, 19:00

Bronze-medal game
Sunday, March 19, 9:00

Gold-medal game
Sunday, March 19, 13:30

Women

Teams

Round-robin standings
Final Round Robin Standings

Round-robin results

Draw 1
Saturday, March 11, 08:30

Draw 2
Saturday, March 11, 19:00

Draw 3
Sunday, March 12, 14:00

Draw 4
Monday, March 13, 9:00

Draw 5
Monday, March 13, 19:00

Draw 6
Tuesday, March 14, 14:00

Draw 7
Wednesday, March 15, 9:00

Draw 8
Wednesday, March 15, 19:00

Draw 9
Thursday, March 16, 14:00

Relegation game
Friday, March 17, 9:00

 relegated to 2007 European Junior Curling Challenge.

Tiebreakers
Friday, March 17, 9:00

Playoffs

Semifinals
Saturday, March 18, 14:00

Bronze-medal game
Sunday, March 19, 9:00

Gold-medal game
Sunday, March 19, 13:30

External links

World Junior Curling Championships, 2006
World Junior Curling Championships
Sports competitions in Jeonju
2006 in South Korean sport
International curling competitions hosted by South Korea